Edward Neville da Costa Andrade FRS (27 December 1887 – 6 June 1971) was an English physicist, writer, and poet. He told The Literary Digest his name was pronounced "as written, i.e., like air raid, with and substituted for air." In the scientific world Andrade is best known for work (with Ernest Rutherford) that first determined the wavelength of a type of gamma radiation, proving it was far higher in energies than X-rays known at the time.  In popular culture he was best known for his appearances on The Brains Trust.

Life
Edward Neville Andrade was a Sephardi Jew, his family having arrived in London from Portugal during the Napoleonic era, and was a descendant of Moses da Costa Andrade (not Moses da Costa as is sometimes stated). da Costa Andrade was his 2nd great-grandfather, a feather merchant in London's East End. The surname "Andrade" might nevertheless be of Portuguese origin (see notes on original pronunciation) born and raised in London he attended St. Dunstan's College in Catford, which was noted as the first school to have a laboratory for teaching secondary school age pupils. From there he attended University College London under Prof F. T. Trouton where he gain a first-class honours degree in physics in 1907. After graduating he stayed on to pursue research, choosing to study the flow of solid metals under stress, a subject to which he returned several times over the sixty-year course of his research career

In 1910 Edward Neville studied for a doctorate on the electrical properties of flames under Prof Lenard at the University of Heidelberg and then had a brief but productive spell of research with Ernest Rutherford at Manchester in 1914. They carried out diffraction experiments to determine the wavelengths of gamma-rays from radium, and were the first to be able to quantitate these, thereby showing that they were shorter than the wavelengths of then-known X-ray radiation that was produced by "Roentgen tubes". He joined the Royal Artillery during the First World War, and then became Professor of Physics at the Ordnance College in Woolwich in 1920.

Career
He was Quain Professor of Physics at University College, London from 1928 to 1950, and then Fullerian Professor of Chemistry at the Royal Institution for three years, until opposition to his attempts to reform the RI led to a vote of no confidence in him by members of the RI, following which he resigned. In 1943 Andrade was invited to deliver the Royal Institution Christmas Lectures on Vibrations and Waves, then in 1950 he developed the lectures further and presented the series on Waves and Vibrations.

Andrade was also a broadcaster, coming to fame during the War on BBC radio's The Brains Trust.
The Structure of the Atom (1923)
Engines (1928)
The Mechanism of Nature (1930)
Simple Science with Julian Huxley.
More Simple Science (1935) with Julian Huxley.
Sir Isaac Newton (1950)
An Approach to Modern Physics (1956)
A Brief History of the Royal Society (1960)
Physics for the Modern World (1962)
Rutherford and the Nature of the Atom (1964)

His papers are held by the University of Leicester

References

External links 

 E N da C Andrade: Some Personal Reminiscences (pdf)
 Oral History interview transcript with Edward Andrade on 18 December 1962, American Institute of Physics, Niels Bohr Library and Archives

English physicists
English radio personalities
English non-fiction writers
Fellows of the Royal Society
English Jews
Jewish poets
Jewish physicists
Heidelberg University alumni
Academics of University College London
1887 births
1971 deaths
Presidents of the Physical Society
English male poets
20th-century English poets
20th-century English male writers
English male non-fiction writers
British expatriates in Germany
Military personnel from London
Royal Artillery officers
British Army personnel of World War I
British people of Portuguese descent